World Record is the seventh studio album by the British progressive rock group Van der Graaf Generator, originally released in 1976 on Charisma Records. Bonus tracks were added for the 2005 rerelease.

It was the last album recorded by the classic line-up of the band until their 2005 reunion: Hugh Banton and David Jackson departed in December 1976 and January 1977 respectively. Banton's departure owed to financial troubles and his then-recent marriage, but he stayed to finish touring commitments. Jackson continued with Peter Hammill and Guy Evans to rehearse with the new line-up in January 1977, which featured returning bassist Nic Potter and newcomer violinist Graham Smith (of Scottish folk-rock act String Driven Thing), but left shortly after the band started rehearsing, just before the next tour.

Track listing 
All songs written by Peter Hammill, except where noted.

2005 re-release bonus tracks 
 "When She Comes" – 8:13
 "Masks" – 7:23 
both recorded for the BBC Radio One "The John Peel Show", 11 November 1976

Personnel 
Van der Graaf Generator
 Peter Hammill – vocals, guitar, piano
 David Jackson – saxophone, flute
 Hugh Banton – Hammond organ, bass pedals, Mellotron
 Guy Evans – drums, percussion, cymbal

References

External links 
 World Record (1976) at vandergraafgenerator.co.uk
 Van der Graaf Generator - World Record (1976) - review by Steven McDonald at AllMusic.com
 Van der Graaf Generator - World Record (1976) - at Discogs.com
 Van der Graaf Generator - World Record (1976) - stream at Spotify.com

World Record
1976 albums
Charisma Records albums
Mercury Records albums
Albums recorded at Rockfield Studios